Tim Richardson, author of Sweets: The History of Temptation, is the world's first international confectionery historian. He also writes about gardens, landscape and theatre, and contributes to the Daily Telegraph, Country Life, The Idler, House & Garden, Garden Design Journal and Wallpaper. He lives in North London. In 2012 Tim founded The Chelsea Fringe (chelseafringe.com) to celebrate the more quirky horticulture that didn't quite make the Chelsea Flower Show. It takes place each year during the fortnight around the Chelsea Flower Show.

He wrote and performed comedy at Oxford University in the 1980s in a revue group called The Seven Raymonds with Stewart Lee, Richard Herring, Emma Kennedy, and Michael Cosgrave.

Bibliography

The Arcadian Friends: Inventing the English Landscape Garden (2007)
Avant Gardeners: 50 Visionaries of the Contemporary Landscape (2008)

Oxford College Gardens (2018)

References

British food writers
Living people
Country Life (magazine) people
Year of birth missing (living people)